Giovanni Spadolini (21 June 1925 – 4 August 1994) was an Italian politician and statesman, who served as the 44th prime minister of Italy. He had been a leading figure in the Republican Party and the first head of a government to not be a member of Christian Democrats since 1945. He was also a newspaper editor, journalist and historian. He is considered a highly respected intellectual for his literary works and his cultural dimension.

Professor of Contemporary History at the University of Florence, he was the author of numerous historical works. He was also a journalist and editor-in-chief of the Bolognese newspaper Il Resto del Carlino, then of the Milanese newspaper Il Corriere della Sera.

Spadolini was the first Italian Minister of Cultural Heritage and Environment from 1974 to 1976. He became Prime Minister in 1981 and he led two successive cabinets which were supported by a coalition of parties in Parliament but this only lasted a few months. He was Minister of Defence in the governments headed by Socialist leader Bettino Craxi from 1983 to 1987 before being elected President of the Senate. In 1991, Spadolini was appointed Lifetime Senator by President Francesco Cossiga.

Early life
Spadolini was born in Florence in 1925. In his youth he worked in a public library. Spadolini was a republican and fascist-aligned activist, and wrote for the periodical Italia e Civiltà ("Italy and Civilisation"). He was close to Giovanni Gentile, and a number of times Spadolini expressed his anti-Freemason, anti-liberal and anti-semitic views. In 1944, during the Italian Civil War, he joined the Italian Social Republic.

During the post-war period (from 1945 to 1950) Spadolini revised his old ideas, and became a moderate liberal conservative. He also rejected anti-semitism in favour of Zionism. He studied law at the University of Florence and shortly after graduation was appointed Professor of Contemporary History in the Faculty of Political Science. He also became a political columnist for several newspapers, such as Il Borghese, Il Messaggero and Il Mondo, becoming editor-in-chief of the Bologna paper Il Resto del Carlino in 1955, doubling its circulation during his tenure. In 1968, Spadolini moved to Milan where he took over the editorship of Italy's largest newspaper, Corriere della Sera, a position he held until 1972. In that year, he was elected as a senator, going on to serve as minister of the environment and then minister of education. Then in 1979, he was appointed secretary of the small but powerful Italian Republican Party (PRI).

As a journalist, he sometimes used the pseudonym Giovanni dalle Bande Nere (Giovanni of the Black Bands).

Prime Minister of Italy

He served as Prime Minister of Italy from 1981 to 1982, the first PM since 1945 not to be a member of the Christian Democrats. He pledged to fight corruption (in particular a scandal involving certain Italian political figures connected with a Masonic lodge known as P2) and mounting terrorist violence.

In foreign policy, he was a non-interventionist but also moderately Americanist. In particular, he shifted away from Italy's previous pro-Arab policy, refusing to meet Yasser Arafat during his official visit to Italy to protest the murder of Stefano Gaj Taché, an Italian Jewish child, by PLO terrorists, and suggesting that the Bologna train station bombing may have been perpetrated by the PLO and Gaddafi's Libya, in spite of a majority accusing neo-fascists.

In 1982, after a political crisis between the Minister of the Treasury Beniamino Andreatta (DC) and the Minister of Finance Rino Formica (PSI), Spadolini resigned and formed a new cabinet identical to the former, which collapsed in November when Bettino Craxi's Socialist Party withdrew its support.

Later life
Under his leadership, the PRI obtained 5% of all votes for the first time in the 1983 Italian general election. From 1987 to April 1994, he was president of the Italian Senate. He became Acting President of Italy on 28 April 1992, upon the resignation of then President Francesco Cossiga, for a month. Following the electoral success of Silvio Berlusconi's Forza Italia, he lost the chairmanship of the Senate to Carlo Scognamiglio Pasini by a single vote.

Personal life and death
Spadolini never married. In July 1994 he had a stomach operation. He died of respiratory failure in Rome in August 1994.

Electoral history

References

External links

1925 births
1994 deaths
20th-century Italian journalists
Candidates for President of Italy
Culture ministers of Italy
Deaths from respiratory failure
Deputies of Legislature VI of Italy
Deputies of Legislature VII of Italy
Deputies of Legislature VIII of Italy
Deputies of Legislature IX of Italy
Deputies of Legislature X of Italy
Italian Ministers of Defence
Italian Republican Party politicians
Italian life senators
Italian male journalists
Italian newspaper editors
Politicians from Florence
Presidents of the Italian Senate
Prime Ministers of Italy